Sabrina Fanchini (born 17 August 1988) is a retired Italian alpine skier.

She is a sister of Elena and Nadia Fanchini.

Career
She made her FIS Alpine Ski World Cup debut in December 2010 in Courchevel, also collecting her first World Cup points with a 28th place. She followed up with two 26th places before improving to an 8th place in the December 2011 Lienz giant slalom. Her last World Cup points came in the same race two years later, where she finished 16th , but she then proceeded to compete in the 2014–15 and 2015–16 World Cup circuits without finishing any races.

She represented the military sports club CS Esercito.

References

External links
 
 

1988 births
Living people
Sportspeople from the Province of Bergamo
Italian female alpine skiers
People from Lovere
21st-century Italian women
Alpine skiers of Gruppo  Sportivo Esercito